Denis Dmitrievich Bushuev (born 15 February 1982) is a German football manager whose career has been mostly in Germany, and a former player.

Coaching career
On 9 May 2016, Bushuev became head coach of 1860 Munich as interim manager. He managed one match, a 2–1 loss against FSV Frankfurt in the 2. Bundesliga.

References

External links
 https://rfs.ru/U17/representatives/view?repr_id=1178
 

Living people
1982 births
Footballers from Saint Petersburg
Russian footballers
Russia under-21 international footballers
Association football midfielders
FC Leningradets Leningrad Oblast managers
FC Zenit-2 Saint Petersburg players
Hertha BSC II players
Rot-Weiß Oberhausen players
TSV 1860 Munich players
TSV 1860 Munich II players
Russian football managers
TSV 1860 Munich managers
Russian expatriate footballers
Russian expatriate football managers
Russian expatriate sportspeople in Germany
Expatriate football managers in Germany
Expatriate footballers in Germany